General Loch may refer to:

Edward Loch, 2nd Baron Loch (1873–1942), British Army major general
Herbert Loch (1886–1976), German Wehrmacht general of the artillery
Kenneth Loch (1890–1961), British Army lieutenant general

See also
General Locke (disambiguation)